Inis Neziri (born 12 January 2001) is an Albanian singer and songwriter. She has been crowned the winner of numerous festivals including the Romanian Golden Stag and Russian New Wave.

Life and career 

In 2013, Neziri began to dedicate herself to music when she was twelve as she won the 5th edition of the Albanian children's talent show Gjeniu i Vogël. In December 2017, she successfully participated in the 56th edition of Festivali i Këngës with the song "Piedestal" where she finished in the third place. In September 2018, she took part in the Golden Stag Festival in Romania and eventually emerged as the winner of the competition. In October 2020, the Albanian broadcaster, Radio Televizioni Shqiptar (RTSH), announced her as one of the contestants selected to compete in the 59th edition of Festivali i Këngës with the song "Pendesë".

Discography

Singles

As lead artist

References 

2001 births
Living people
Musicians from Tirana
21st-century Albanian women singers
Festivali i Këngës contestants
Golden Stag winners
New Wave winners